Peth, in the Marathi language, is a general locality in the Indian city of Pune. Up to seventeen peths are located in central Pune, and were mostly established during Maratha and Peshwa rule in the 17th-19th century AD. Seven of them are named after the days of the week in Marathi: traders and craftsmen in a given locality mainly conducted business only on that day of the week.

Today the peths form the heart of Pune city, and are referred to as the old city, or simply city. They are considered to be the cultural heart of Pune.

Sources

See also 
 List of neighbourhoods in Pune
 Pune

 
Pune-related lists
Lists of neighbourhoods in Indian cities